Winyah School, also known as Winyah Graded and High School, Georgetown Graded & High School, and Old Winyah School, is a historic school building located at Georgetown, Georgetown County, South Carolina. It consists of a 1908 Classical Revival style school building and auditorium, with an auditorium extension and high school addition built about 1924. It has a raised masonry and concrete foundation and low hipped roof.

It was listed on the National Register of Historic Places in 1988.

Winyah High School served white students while Howard High School served African American students. An arson attack damaged it in the 1980s. Integrated Georgetown High School replaced it and Howard High School.

References

School buildings on the National Register of Historic Places in South Carolina
School buildings completed in 1924
Neoclassical architecture in South Carolina
National Register of Historic Places in Georgetown County, South Carolina
Schools in Georgetown County, South Carolina
Buildings and structures in Georgetown, South Carolina
1924 establishments in South Carolina